Shaun Martin is an American composer, arranger,  producer, and multi-instrumental musician. Martin is a member of the jazz fusion band Snarky Puppy, as well as music director for Gospel music star Kirk Franklin, and former Minister of Music  at Dallas’ Friendship-West Baptist Church.  Martin has been awarded four Grammies for his work with Franklin and two as a member of Snarky Puppy.

Early life
A native of Dallas, Texas, Martin's mother started him on piano lessons when he was only four years old, learning classical music and jazz. Through his church, he also learned gospel music. He attended Dallas' Booker T. Washington High School for the Performing and Visual Arts before attending Weatherford College and the University of North Texas . Martin began working with Gospel choir director Kirk Franklin while still in high school.  He earned a Bachelor of Applied Arts and Sciences degree from North Texas. While still a student at North Texas, he was involved in the production and recording of Erykah Badu's hit album Mama's Gun.

Career

Awards and recognition
 2007 Grammy Award for Best Contemporary R&B Gospel Album as producer on the Kirk Franklin album Hero 
 2009 Grammy Award for Best Contemporary R&B Gospel Album as producer on the Kirk Franklin album The Fight of My Life 
 2012 Grammy Award for Best Gospel Album as producer on the Kirk Franklin album Hello Fear 
 2016 Grammy Award for Best Contemporary Instrumental Album as a member of Snarky Puppy on its album Culcha Vulcha 
 2019 Grammy Award for Best Gospel Album as producer on the Kirk Franklin album Long, Live, Love 
2021 Grammy Award for Best Contemporary Instrumental Album as a member of  Snarky Puppy on its album Live at the Royal Albert Hall.

DiscographySource: 

 7 Summers (Ropeadope, 2015)
 Focus (Ropeadope, 2018)
 Three-O (Ropeadope, 2020)

with Kirk Franklin
 God's Property (B-Rite Music, 1997)
 The Rebirth of Kirk Franklin (GospoCentric, 2002)
 Hero (Verity, 2005)
 Songs for the Storm, Vol. 1 (GospoCentric, 2006)
 The Fight of My Life (GospoCentric, 2007)
 Hello Fear  (GospoCentric, 2011)
 The Essential Kirk Franklin (GospoCentric, 2012)
 Losing My Religion (Fo Yo Soul / RCA, 2015)
 Long, Live, Love (Fo Yo Soul / RCA, 2019)

with Snarky Puppy
 Tell Your Friends (Ropeadope, 2010)
 groundUP (GroundUP, 2012)
 We Like It Here (Ropeadope, 2014)
 Culcha Vulcha (GroundUP, 2016)
 Immigrance (GroundUP, 2019)
 Live at the Royal Albert Hall (GroundUP, 2020)

with Spike Lee & Terence Blanchard
 Get on the Bus Original soundtrack (Interscope Records, 1996)

with Mark Anthony White
 Sacrifice of Praise (J'Maw Music, 1998)

with Erykah Badu
 Mama's Gun (Motown, 2000)

with Guru
 Guru's Jazzmatazz, Vol. 3: Streetsoull (Virgin, 2000)
 The Best of Guru's Jazzmatazz (Virgin, 2008)

with N'Dambi
 Tunin' Up & Cosignin (Cheeky I, 2001)with Donnie McClurkin Again (Verity, 2003)with Quamon Fowler The Vision (Core Instrumental Music, 2005) with Myron Butler & Levi (composer only)
 Set Me Free (EMI, 2005)
 Stronger (EMI, 2007)
 Double Take/Myron Butler (EMI, 2007)with Fred Hammond Free to Worship (Verity, 2006)
 I Will Trust (RCA Inspiration, 2014)with Doc Powell Doc Powell (Telarc, Heads Up, 2006)with Tamela Mann The Live Experience (Tillymann, 2007)
 The Master Plan (Tillymann, 2009)
 Best Days (Tillymann, 2012)
 One Way (Tillymann, 2016)with Kristen Mari N My Shoes (Ultrax, 2007)with Dwayne Kerr Higher Calling (Dmanns, 2007)with Anthony Evans The Bridge (EMI, 2008)with Crystal Aikin Crystal Aikin (Verity, 2009)with Various Artists (as Producer)
 The Very Best of Praise & Worship (Verity, 2008)
 Gotta Have Gospel! Ultimate Choirs (GospoCentric / Integrity Music / Verity, 2010)
 Wow Gospel 2012 (Verity, 2012)
 Wow Gospel 2013 (RCA / Verity, 2013)
 Wow Gospel 2014 (RCA / RCA Inspiration, 2014)
 Wow: Gospel 2015: The Year's 30 Top Gospel Artists And Songs (RCA / RCA Inspiration, 2015)with The Colourphonics The Colourphonics (ProgRock Records, 2010)with T. D. Jakes Sacred Love Songs, Vol. 2 (Dexterity Sounds, 2011) with Amber Bullock So in Love (Music World Gospel, 2012)with James Fortune / James Fortune & FIYA Identity (EOne, 2012)
 Dear Future Me (EOne, 2017)
 Dream Again (EOne, 2019)with Tasha Page-Lockhart Here Right Now (Fo Yo Soul / RCA, 2014)with The Walls Group Fast Forward (Fo Yo Soul / RCA, 2014)with Björk (as Tour manager)
 Biophilia Live (One Little Indian, 2014) with Geoffrey Golden Kingdom...Live! (Fo Yo Soul / RCA, 2015)with Mark Lettieri Spark and Echo (Ropeadope, 2016)with Maz (Mike Maher) Idealist (GroundUP, 2016)with David Crosby Sky Trails (BMG, 2017)with Ledisi Let Love Rule (Verve, 2017)

with Larnell Lewis
 In the Moment (Larnell Lewis, 2018)

with Jonathan Scales Fourchestra
 Pillar (Ropeadope, 2018)with Brian Courtney Wilson A Great Work (Motown, 2018)with Kurt Carr' Bless Somebody Else'' (RCA, 2019)

References

External links
 Official website
 Snarky Puppy website

1978 births
Living people
Musicians from Dallas
University of North Texas alumni
21st-century American composers
21st-century American male musicians
Record producers from Texas
Gospel music composers
Male jazz musicians
American jazz keyboardists
American gospel musicians
Jazz fusion musicians
Ropeadope Records artists
Grammy Award winners
Snarky Puppy members